33rd Guards Berislav-Khingan Twice Red Banner Order of Suvorov Rocket Army is one of the three rocket armies that exist today within the Russian Strategic Rocket Forces. It is headquartered at Omsk in Southwestern Siberia.

The 33rd Guards Rocket Army was formed in April 1970 from the 7th Separate Guards Berislav Twice Red Banner Order of Suvorov Rocket Corps, which inherited the honors of the 109th Guards Rifle Division.

Composition 
In 1971, the army comprised the 36th Guards Rocket Division (Krasnoyarsk, Krasnoyarsk Kray); the 39th Guards Rocket Division (Pashino, Novosibirsk Oblast); the 41st Guards Rocket Division (Aleysk, Altai Kray); the 57th Rocket Division (Zhangiz Tobe, Semipalatinsk Oblast); the 62nd Rocket Division (Uzhur, Krasnoyarsk Kray); the 93rd Rocket Brigade (Tyumen, Tyumen Oblast); the 97th Rocket Brigade (Itatka, Tomsk Oblast); and the 290th Independent Rocket Regiment (Omsk, Omsk Oblast). The 290th Independent Rocket Regiment and the 93rd Rocket Brigade were disbanded in 1976.

The 35th Rocket Division became attached to the Army in 1981.

There are four rocket divisions that were in 2009 under command of the 33rd Army:
 62nd Rocket Division
 39th Guards Rocket Division (former 1st Guards Breakthrough Artillery Division)
 35th Rocket Division
 29th Guards Rocket Division

From 1993 to 1996 the 38th Rocket Division at Derzhavinsk, Turgay Oblast, Kazakhstan was under the control of the 33rd Guards Rocket Army.

From 16 September 2002 to 2007, the 23rd Guards Orlovsko-Berlinskaya Order of Lenin Red Banner Rocket Division (Military Unit Number 21201) was under the command of the 33rd Army.

Equipment 
The 33rd Army is equipped with R-36M2 and RT-2PM Topol intercontinental ballistic missiles.

Commanders 

27 June 1970 – 12 June 1977: Lieutenant General Alexandr I. Khlopov
12 June 1977 – 21 April 1980: Major General Viktor M. Yegorov
 21 April 1980 – 12 June 1984: Lieutenant General Stanislav G. Kochemasov
 12 June 1984 – 6 January 1989: Lieutenant General Yuri I. Plotnikov
 6 January 1989 – 20 May 1993: Major General Vitaly V. Moroz
 20 May 1993 – 14 August 1995: Major General Alexey A. Kasyanov
 14 August 1995 – 14 May 2002: Major General Alexandr L. Konarev
 14 May 2002 –16 June 2006: Major General Andrey A. Shvaychenko
 16 June 2006–2010: Lieutenant General Gennady Privalov
 2010–March 2017: Major General (promoted to Lieutenant General 2013) Aleksandr Ponomarenko
 9 March 2017–July 2020: Major General (promoted to Lieutenant General 2019) Igor Afonin
 July 2020–March 2021: Major General Oleg Glazunov
 since 2021: Major General (Guards) Vladimir Viktorovich Kvashin

References

Further reading
 
"Омская гвардейская ракетная Бориславско-Хинганская дважды Краснознаменная ордена Суворова армия 1959-2009" (Omskaya Borislavsko-Khinganskaya twice Red Banner order of Suvorov Missile Army 1959-2009) by M.V. Ermolaeva; Omsk, 2009; 372 pages.

Military units and formations of the Strategic Rocket Forces
Military units and formations established in 1970
Armies (military formations) of the Soviet Union
Armies of the Russian Federation
Guards Armies